Catrine Johansson (born 18 December 1991) is a Swedish footballer. She plays as a defender for BK Häcken of the Damallsvenskan.

Honours

Club
Kopparbergs/Göteborg FC
Winner
 Svenska Supercupen: 2013
 Svenska Cupen: 2012

Runner-up
 Svenska Supercupen: 2012

External links
 
 
 
 
 Profile at soccerdonna.de 
 Profile at worldfootball.net 

1991 births
Living people
Swedish women's footballers
BK Häcken FF players
Damallsvenskan players
Women's association football defenders
Footballers from Gothenburg
Sweden women's youth international footballers